Ania Teliczan is the self-titled debut studio album from Polish singer-songwriter Ania Teliczan. It was released on 16 January 2012 and consists of 10 songs in style of 60's in English and Polish, some of which written by Andrzej Piaseczny and Teliczan herself. The album was recorded in the United Kingdom with producer Troy Miller, who previously worked with Amy Winehouse.

Track listing

Charts

Release history

References

2012 debut albums
Sony Music Poland albums